Wrathall is a surname. It may refer to:
Bill Wrathall (1931–1995), New Zealand cartoonist
Frank Wrathall (born 1986), British motor racing driver 
Harry Wrathall (1869–1944), English cricketer
John Wrathall (1913–1978), Rhodesian politician
John Wrathall (footballer), New Zealand football player 
Mark Wrathall (born 1965), professor of philosophy
John Wrathall Bull (1804–1886), early settler of South Australia, inventor and author

See also: James and Penninah Wrathall House